Olympiacos Women's Water Polo Club is the women's water polo department of the major Greek multi-sport club Olympiacos, based in Piraeus. The department was founded in 1988 and they play their games at the 1000-seated Papastrateio "Petros Kapagerof" Pool in Piraeus.

Olympiacos is one of the most successful clubs in European water polo, having won 3 LEN Euro Leagues in 2015, 2021 and 2022, 3 LEN Super Cups in 2015, 2021, 2022 and 1 LEN Trophy in 2014 and having, overall, a commanding presence in European competitions. Besides the 3 LEN Euro Leagues, 3 LEN Super Cups and 1 LEN Trophy titles, they were runners-up of the LEN Euro League in 2017 and 2019, runners-up of the LEN Super Cup in 2014, runners-up of the LEN Trophy in 2008 and 2018 and they have participated, altogether, in 9 Champions' Cup / Euro League Final Fours (1996, 2010, 2011, 2015, 2016, 2017, 2019, 2021, 2022), as well as in 5 LEN Trophy Final Fours (2001, 2007, 2008, 2014, 2018), being semi-finalists of the same competition in 2009 and 2012.

In 2014 Olympiacos won the LEN Trophy in the Final Four in Florence, beating home team Firenze 10–9 in the final. One year later, Olympiacos were crowned European Champions, winning the LEN Euro League in the 2015 Final Four in Piraeus, after a 10–9 win in the final against the then-reigning champions Sabadell, who were undefeated for more than 3 years with 115 consecutive wins in all competitions. Olympiacos lifted the LEN Euro League title undefeated and having won 8 straight matches without even a single draw. Subsequently, Olympiacos won the 2015 LEN Super Cup as well, defeating Plebiscito Padova, thus completing a continental Treble in 2015 (LEN Euro League, LEN Super Cup, Greek Championship), winning season's all three available titles.

In 2021 Olympiacos won their second LEN Euro League title in Budapest, beating home teams UVSE (9–8 in the semi-final) and Dunaújvárosi (7–6 in the final) with a roster composed entirely of Greek players. They went on to win the Greek League and the Greek Cup, thus completing the first ever Triple Crown for a Greek club in the sport's history, which eventually became a Quadruple Crown after winning the 2021 LEN Super Cup.

In 2022 Olympiacos were crowned back-to-back European Champions in Piraeus, beating UVSE (18–11 in the semi-final) and Sabadell (11–7 in the final). They went on to win the Greek League, the Greek Cup and the 2022 LEN Super Cup, thus completing the second (back-to-back) Quadruple Crown in their history.

After the 2015 LEN Euroleague win of Olympiacos women's water polo team, Olympiacos CFP became the only multi-sport club in European water polo history after Pro Recco to have been crowned European Champions with both its men's and women's departments, and the only club with both its departments currently active (Pro Recco Women's department has been dissolved since 2012).

Domestically, Olympiacos is the most successful Greek club, having won a record 13 Greek Championships, a record 5 Greek Cups, a record 1 Greek Super Cup and a record 3 Doubles. They also hold the all-time record for the most consecutive Greek Championships, as they are the only team to have won 9 consecutive Greek Championship titles (2014–2022). They won their first two titles in 1995 and 1998, but their best performance in the league came after coach Charis Pavlidis' arrival in 2007. Beginning from season 2010–11, Olympiacos has won ten Greek Championships in twelve seasons (2011, 2014–2022). In the 2015–16, 2019–20, 2020–21 and 2021–22 seasons, Olympiacos won the Greek Championship undefeated, winning every game in both the regular season and the play-offs. They won the first-ever Greek Cup which was held in 2017–18 season and the first-ever Greek Super Cup held in 2020.

Some of the greatest players in the world (many of them Olympic medalists and World Champions) have played for Olympiacos over the years including: Iefke van Belkum, Alexandra Asimaki, Yasemin Smit, Lauren Wenger, Ashleigh Southern, Bronwen Knox, Roberta Bianconi, Giulia Emmolo, Kami Craig, Jordan Raney, Triantafyllia Manolioudaki, Alkisti Avramidou, Eleftheria Plevritou, Margarita Plevritou, Chrysi Diamantopoulou, Vaso Plevritou, Nikoleta Eleftheriadou, Stavroula Antonakou, Ilektra Psouni, Angeliki Karapataki, Antonia Moraiti, Evi Moraitidou, Anthoula Mylonaki, Dimitra Asilian, Eftychia Karagianni, Maria Kanellopoulou, Christina Tsoukala, Eleni Xenaki, Ioanna Stamatopoulou, Kyra Christmas, Brigitte Sleeking, Kyriaki Liosi, Patricia del Soto, Blanca Gil, Barbara Bujka, Ágnes Valkai, Vaso Mavrelou, Maria Balomenaki, Ann Dow, Camila Pedrosa, Sun Yating, Eszter Tomaskovics, Maria Tsouri and Assel Jakayeva.

History

Charis Pavlidis era and absolute domination (2007–2021)

Current roster 
2022–2023
Squad as of November 2022

Honours

Domestic competitions 
 Greek League
 Winners (13) (record): 1994–95, 1997–98, 2008–09, 2010–11, 2013–14, 2014–15, 2015–16, 2016–17, 2017–18, 2018–19, 2019–20, 2020–21, 2021–22
 Greek Cup
 Winners (5) (record): 2017–18, 2019–20, 2020–21, 2021–22, 2022–23
 Greek Super Cup
 Winners (1) (record):  2019–20

European competitions
 LEN Euro League
 Winners (3): 2014–15, 2020–21, 2021–22
 Runners-up (2): 2016–17, 2018–19
 3rd place (1): 2010–11
 4th place (3): 1995–96, 2009–10, 2015–16
 LEN Super Cup
 Winners (3): 2015, 2021, 2022
 Runners-up (1): 2014
 LEN Trophy
 Winners (1): 2013–14
 Runners-up (2): 2007–08, 2017–18
 Semi-finals (2): 2008–09, 2011–12
 4th place (2): 2000–01, 2006–07

Individual club awards
 Quadruple Crown
 Winners (2): 2020–21 (LEN Euro League, LEN Super Cup, Greek League, Greek Cup), 2021–22 (LEN Euro League, LEN Super Cup, Greek League, Greek Cup)
 Continental Treble
 Winners (1): 2014–15 (LEN Euro League, LEN Super Cup, Greek League)
 Double
 Winners (4) (record): 2017–18, 2019–20, 2020–21, 2021–22 (Greek League, Greek Cup)

International record

The road to the 2021–22 LEN Euro League victory

The road to the 2020–21 LEN Euro League victory

The road to the 2014–15 LEN Euro League victory

The road to the 2013–14 LEN Trophy victory

Notable players

Notable coaches

Personnel

Management, coaching and technical staff

See also
 Olympiacos Men's Water Polo Team

References

External links

 Olympiacos CFP official website – Women's Water Polo 

 
Water polo clubs in Greece
Water Polo